Pratap Chandra Mohanty (October 23, 1920 – March 15, 1993) was a politician from Odisha, India. From Tirtol constituency, he was elected 4 times to the Odisha Legislative Assembly during the 3rd (1961),
5th (1971),
6th (1974),
and 7th (1977) assembly elections.
He was a cabinet minister in Odisha holding Revenue, Irrigation & Power (Lift Irrigation), Commerce & Transport, Education & Youth Affairs portfolios in the 1970s. Pratap Chandra Mohanty was also detained under Maintenance of Internal Security Act (MISA) for about one year during The Emergency. 
He was the president of Maa Sarala Temple Trust, Jagatsinghpur from 09 December 1957 to 26 October 1966.

References 

1920 births
1993 deaths
Members of the Odisha Legislative Assembly
People from Cuttack
People from Jagatsinghpur district
Odisha politicians
Janata Dal politicians
Janata Party politicians
Utkal Congress politicians
Indian National Congress politicians from Odisha
Orissa MLAs 1961–1967
Indians imprisoned during the Emergency (India)